Natasha Elisabeth Beaumont (born 21 June 1974) is a Malaysian-born British-Australian actress and model.

Beaumont was born in Kuala Lumpur, Malaysia. She grew up in Kuala Lumpur, attended boarding school in Sydney and moved at age 20 to attend Charles Sturt University in Bathurst, Australia. She initially studied set and costume design but changed to acting. Beaumont starred as Talia in Cartoon Network's My Spy Family – a former Russian spy who will now stop at nothing to help her children succeed. The show ended in 2010. She also played Rebecca Green in All Saints from 2001 until 2003 and her role as SJ Fletcher in EastEnders in 2006.

She also played Tania in Rowan Woods' Little Fish, and had a role in a film called Dark Love Story. Aside from those she has also had guest roles in The Lost World and Farscape, and had a role in Australian police drama Water Rats.

Beaumont has also appeared in several stage productions including David Williamson's Amigos (costarring Gary McDonald) for the Sydney Theatre Company in 2004 and The Return at the Old Red Lion in London, 2005.

She also played 'Saz' in an episode of Peep Show entitled 'Jeremy's Broke' (series 5, episode 3).

Filmography

Film

Television

References

External links

Australian soap opera actresses
Australian stage actresses
Malaysian people of Australian descent
Malaysian people of British descent
1974 births
Living people
Australian people of British descent
People from Kuala Lumpur
Charles Sturt University alumni